Fort Lee is a borough at the eastern border of Bergen County, in the U.S. state of New Jersey, situated along the Hudson River atop The Palisades.

As of the 2020 United States census, the borough's population was 40,191, an increase of 4,846 (+13.7%) from the 2010 census count of 35,345, which in turn reflected a decline of 116 (−0.3%) from the 35,461 counted in the 2000 census. Along with other communities in Bergen County, it is one of the largest and fastest-growing ethnic Korean enclaves outside of Korea.

Fort Lee is named for the site of an American Revolutionary War military encampment. At the turn of the 20th century it became the birthplace of the American film industry. In 1931, the borough became the western terminus of the George Washington Bridge, which crosses the Hudson River and connects to the borough of Manhattan in New York City. Fort Lee's population and housing density increased considerably during the 1960s and 1970s with the construction of highrise apartment buildings.

Geography
According to the United States Census Bureau, Fort Lee borough had a total area of 2.87 square miles (7.44 km2), including 2.52 square miles (6.52 km2) of land and 0.35 square miles (0.92 km2) of water (12.33%).

The borough is situated atop the escarpment of the Hudson Palisades on the peninsula between the Hackensack and Hudson rivers. The borough is bisected by the confluence of roads at GWB Plaza leading to the George Washington Bridge.

Unincorporated communities, localities and place names located partially or completely within the borough include Coytesville, Linwood, Palisade and Taylorville.

The borough borders Cliffside Park, Edgewater, Englewood, Englewood Cliffs, Leonia, Palisades Park, Ridgefield in Bergen County;  and the Washington Heights neighborhood of Upper Manhattan in New York City. Given its evolving cosmopolitan ambiance and adjacent proximity to Manhattan, Fort Lee is one of Northern New Jersey's Hudson Waterfront communities that has been called New York City's Sixth Borough,

History

Early settlement
The Lenape indigenous peoples were the first to live in the area. Captain Henry Hudson was the first to record the area in 1609. In 1756 Stephen Bourdette acquired 400 acres of land which included modern day Fort Lee.

Colonial era

Originally known as Fort Constitution, Fort Lee was named for General Charles Lee after George Washington and his troops had camped at Mount Constitution overlooking Burdett's Landing, in defense of New York City. It was during Washington's retreat in November 1776 (beginning along a road which is now Main Street) that Thomas Paine composed his pamphlet, The American Crisis, which began with the recognized phrase, "These are the times that try men's souls." These events are recalled at Monument Park and Fort Lee Historic Park.

Formation
Fort Lee was formed by an act of the New Jersey Legislature on March 29, 1904, from the remaining portions of Ridgefield Township. With the creation of Fort Lee, Ridgefield Township became defunct and was dissolved as of March 29, 1904.  The Fort Lee Police Department was formed under borough ordinance on August 9, 1904, and originally consisted of six marshals.

America's first motion picture industry

The history of cinema in the United States can trace its roots to the East Coast where, at one time, Fort Lee was the motion picture capital of America. The industry got its start at the end of the 19th century with the construction of Thomas Edison's "Black Maria", the first motion picture studio, in West Orange, New Jersey. New Jersey offered land at costs considerably less than New York City, and the cities and towns along the Hudson River and the Palisades benefited greatly as a result of the phenomenal growth of the film industry at the turn of the 20th century.

Film-making began attracting both capital and an innovative workforce, and when the Kalem Company began using Fort Lee in 1907 as a location for filming in the area, other filmmakers quickly followed. In 1909, a forerunner of Universal Studios, the Champion Film Company, built the first studio. They were quickly followed by others who either built new studios or who leased facilities in Fort Lee. In the 1910s and 1920s, film companies such as the Independent Moving Pictures Company, Peerless Studios, The Solax Company, Éclair Studios, Goldwyn Picture Corporation, American Méliès (Star Films), World Film Company, Biograph Studios, Fox Film Corporation, Pathé Frères, Metro Pictures Corporation, Victor Film Company, and Selznick Pictures Corporation were all making pictures in Fort Lee. Such notables as Mary Pickford got their start at Biograph Studios.<ref name="Koszarski 2004">Koszarski, Richard. [https://books.google.com/books?id=5w0r8YKan04C&hl=en "Fort Lee: The Film Town], Indiana University Press, 2004. . Accessed May 27, 2015.</ref>

With the offshoot businesses that sprang up to service the film studios, for nearly two decades Fort Lee experienced unrivaled prosperity. However, just as the development of Fort Lee production facilities were gaining strength, Nestor Studios of Bayonne, New Jersey, built the first studio in Hollywood in 1911. Nestor Studios, owned by David and William Horsley, later merged with Universal Studios; and William Horsley's other company, Hollywood Film Laboratory, is now the oldest existing company in Hollywood, now called the Hollywood Digital Laboratory. California's more temperate climate enabled year-round filming and led to the eventual shift of virtually all filmmaking to the West Coast by the 1930s. 

At the time, Thomas Edison owned almost all the patents relevant to motion picture production. Movie producers on the East Coast acting independently of Edison's Motion Picture Patents Company were often sued or enjoined by Edison and his agents, while movie makers working on the West Coast could work independently of Edison's control, in part due to the Ninth Circuit Court of Appeals–which was headquartered in San Francisco and covered most of Southern California–being well known for not enforcing patents claims. 

In nearby Little Ferry on July 9, 1937, a major fire broke out in a 20th Century-Fox storage facility containing hazardous extremely flammable nitrate film reels.

Television and film in New Jersey remains an important industry. Since 2000, the Fort Lee Film Commission has been charged with celebrating the history of film in Fort Lee, as well as attracting film and television production companies to the borough. The Barrymore Film Center promotes films, film making and its history in the borough. Local film is being promoted, especially because of NJ Tax Credit Programs.

Birthplace of subliminal messaging
In 1957, market researcher James Vicary claimed that quickly flashing messages on a movie screen, in Fort Lee, had influenced people to purchase more food and drinks. Vicary coined the term subliminal advertising and formed the Subliminal Projection Company based on a six-week test. Vicary claimed that during the presentation of the movie Picnic he used a tachistoscope to project the words "Drink Coca-Cola" and "Hungry? Eat popcorn" for 1/3000 of a second at five-second intervals. Vicary asserted that during the test, sales of popcorn and Coke in that New Jersey theater increased 57.8% and 18.1% respectively.'Subliminal Advertising – Claim: An early experiment in subliminal advertising at a movie theater substantially increased sales of popcorn and Coke.", Urban Legends Reference Pages, May 3, 2011. Accessed December 7, 2013. "Vicary's studies were largely forgettable, save for one experiment he conducted at a Ft. Lee, New Jersey movie theater during the summer of 1957.... The result of displaying these imperceptible suggestions – Drink Coca-Cola and Hungry? Eat Popcorn – was an amazing 18.1% increase in Coca-Cola sales, and a whopping 57.8% jump in popcorn purchases....  Eventually Vicary confessed that he had falsified the data from his first experiments, and some critics have since expressed doubts that he actually conducted his infamous Ft. Lee experiment at all."

In 1962, Vicary admitted to lying about the experiment and falsifying the results, the story itself being a marketing ploy.Pratkanis, Anthony R. The Cargo-Cult Science of Subliminal Persuasion, The Skeptical Inquirer, Volume 16.3, Spring 1992. Accessed October 13, 2013. "But there is a seamier side to the 'Eat Popcorn/Drink Coke' study-one that is rarely brought to public attention. In a 1962 interview with Advertising Age, James Vicary announced that the original study was a fabrication intended to increase customers for his failing marketing business." An identical experiment conducted by Henry Link showed no increase in cola or popcorn sales. The additional claim that the small cinema handled 45,699 visitors in six weeks has led people to believe that Vicary actually did not conduct his experiment at all.

 Korean community 
A small number of Korean immigrants have resided the area as early as the 1970s. In the 1990s, a continuous stream of Korean immigrants emerged into Fort Lee. A substantial number of affluent and educated Korean American professionals have settled in Bergen County since the early 2000s and have founded various academic and communally supportive  organizations, including the Korean Parent Partnership Organization at the Bergen County Academies magnet high school and The Korean-American Association of New Jersey. Approximately 130 Korean stores were counted in downtown Fort Lee in 2000, a number which has risen significantly since then, featuring restaurants and karaoke (noraebang) bars, grocery markets, education centers and bookstores, banking institutions, offices, electronics vendors, apparel boutiques, and other commercial enterprises.

Various Korean American groups could not reach consensus on the design and wording for a monument in Fort Lee as of early April 2013 to the memory of comfort women, tens of thousands of women and girls, many Korean, who were forced into sexual slavery by Japanese soldiers during World War II.Sullivan, S. p. "Sexual slavery issue, discussed internationally, pivots around one little monument in N.J.", NJ Advance Media for NJ.com, June 8, 2013. Accessed April 13, 2022. "The Palisades Park monument is the first in the United States to recognize what is widely believed to be an international atrocity — the systemic sexual slavery of women from Korea, the Philippines, China, Japan and the Netherlands during WWII. Erected in 2010, it's also prompted a visit from members of the Japanese parliament, been defaced by groups upset with its existence, and inspired similar memorials in Hackensack, Fort Lee and elsewhere in the United States." In May 2012, borough officials in neighboring Palisades Park rejected requests by two diplomatic delegations from Japan to remove such a monument from a public park, a brass plaque on a block of stone, dedicated in 2010; days later, a South Korean delegation had endorsed Palisades Park's decision. In October 2012, a similar memorial was announced in nearby Hackensack, to be raised behind the Bergen County Courthouse, alongside memorials to the Holocaust, the Great Famine of Ireland, and the Armenian genocide, and was unveiled in March 2013.  On May 23, 2018, a comfort women memorial was installed in Constitution Park in Fort Lee. Youth Council of Fort Lee, a student organization led by Korean American high school students in Fort Lee designed the memorial.

George Washington Bridge lane closure scandal
The Fort Lee lane closure scandal, also known as Bridgegate, was a political scandal concerning the actions taken by the staff of New Jersey Governor Chris Christie and his Port Authority appointees to create a traffic jam in Fort Lee when dedicated toll lanes for one of the Fort Lee entrances to the upper level on the George Washington Bridge were reduced from three to one from September 9, 2013, to September 13, 2013.Durando, Jessica; and Symons, Michael. The backstory of Christie's 'Bridgegate' scandal, USA Today, January 10, 2014.  Three members of the Christie administration were convicted on federal conspiracy charges for their roles in the lane closures.

One of the reasons suggested for these actions was to punish Fort Lee Mayor Mark Sokolich, a Democrat, for not supporting the Republican Chris Christie in the 2013 New Jersey gubernatorial election. Another theory was that Christie or his aides sought to punish New Jersey Senate majority leader, Loretta Weinberg, who represented the New Jersey district containing Fort Lee, as retribution for the Democrats' blocking of Christie's reappointment of a New Jersey Supreme Court justice.  Christie withdrew his appointee consideration and delivered a speech referring to New Jersey Senate Democrats as "animals" just one day before emails were sent by Christie's aides to the Port Authority requesting the lane closures.

Demographics
 
At the turn of the 21st century, Fort Lee saw a large Korean migration which has converted much of the town into a large Koreatown, in that many traditional Korean stores and restaurants may be seen in Fort Lee, and the hangul letters of the Korean alphabet are as common as signs in English in parts of the downtown area. This Koreatown is separate from the similar Korean enclave in the adjacent town of Palisades Park. The rapid increase of the Korean population has seen the decline of many other immigrant communities once centered in Fort Lee, notably the Greek and Italian communities, once quite large but now all but extinct. A sizable Russian immigrant community has also sprung up in recent years.

The per capita Korean American population of Bergen County, 6.3% by the 2010 census, (increasing to 6.9% by the 2011 American Community Survey), is the highest of any county in the United States, with all of the nation's top ten municipalities by percentage of Korean population and an absolute total of 56,773 Korean Americans (increasing to 63,247 by the 2011 American Community Survey) living in the county. The concentration of Korean Americans in nearby Palisades Park in turn is the highest of any municipality in Bergen County, at 52% of the population, enumerating 10,115 residents of Korean ancestry; while Fort Lee has nearly as many Koreans by absolute numbers, at 8,318, representing 23.5% of its 2010 population. Along with Koreatowns in New York City and Long Island, the Bergen County Koreatowns serve as the nexus for an overall Korean American population of 218,764 individuals in the Greater New York Combined Statistical Area, the second largest population of ethnic Koreans outside of Korea.

In March 2011, about 2,500 Japanese-Americans were living in Edgewater and Fort Lee, the largest concentration of Japanese-Americans in New Jersey.

There were 1,119 Fort Lee residents who filed claims to recover lost money from the Madoff investment scandal, the most from any ZIP code.

2010 census

The Census Bureau's 2006–2010 American Community Survey showed that (in 2010 inflation-adjusted dollars) median household income was $72,341 (with a margin of error of +/− $4,502) and the median family income was $86,489 (+/− $11,977). Males had a median income of $66,015 (+/− $3,526) versus $55,511 (+/− $3,404) for females. The per capita income for the borough was $44,996 (+/− $2,903). About 5.5% of families and 7.7% of the population were below the poverty line, including 7.1% of those under age 18 and 9.0% of those age 65 or over.

2000 census
As of the 2000 United States census there were 35,461 people, 16,544 households, and 9,396 families residing in the borough. The population density was 14,001.7 people per square mile (5,411.7/km2). There were 17,446 housing units at an average density of 6,888.5 per square mile (2,662.4/km2). The racial makeup of the borough was 62.75% White, 31.43% Asian, 1.73% African American, 0.07% Native American, 0.06% Pacific Islander, 1.69% from other races, and 2.26% from two or more races. Hispanic or Latino of any race were 7.87% of the population.DP-1: Profile of General Demographic Characteristics: 2000 – Census 2000 Summary File 1 (SF 1) 100-Percent Data for Fort Lee borough, Bergen County, New Jersey , United States Census Bureau. Accessed March 5, 2013.

There were 16,544 households, out of which 22.6% had children under the age of 18 living with them, 46.7% were married couples living together, 7.4% had a female householder with no husband present, and 43.2% were non-families. 39.0% of all households were made up of individuals, and 15.2% had someone living alone who was 65 years of age or older. The average household size was 2.14 and the average family size was 2.88.

In the borough the age distribution of the population shows 17.5% under the age of 18, 5.1% from 18 to 24, 32.6% from 25 to 44, 24.7% from 45 to 64, and 20.2% who were 65 years of age or older. The median age was 42 years. For every 100 females, there were 87.7 males. For every 100 females age 18 and over, there were 85.1 males.

The median income for a household in the borough was $58,161, and the median income for a family was $72,140. Males had a median income of $54,730 versus $41,783 for females. The per capita income for the borough was $37,899. About 5.7% of families and 7.9% of the population were below the poverty line, including 10.9% of those under age 18 and 7.9% of those age 65 or over.

As of the 2000 Census, 17.18% of Fort Lee's residents identified themselves as being of Korean ancestry, which was the fifth highest in the United States and third highest of any municipality in New Jersey; behind neighboring Palisades Park (36.38%) and Leonia (17.24%) – for all places with 1,000 or more residents identifying their ancestry. In the same census, 5.56% of Fort Lee's residents identified themselves as being of Chinese ancestry, and 6.09% of Fort Lee's residents identified themselves as being of Japanese ancestry, the highest of any municipality in New Jersey for all places with 1,000 or more residents identifying their ancestry. In the 2010 Census, 23.5% of residents (8,318 individuals) identified themselves as being of Korean ancestry, 7.5% (2,653) as Chinese and 3.7% (1,302) as Japanese.

Economy
Companies based in Fort Lee include Bank of New Jersey, the American Bank Note Company and Cross River Bank.

 Arts and culture 
Since 2007, the Hudson Shakespeare Company has brought their Shakespeare in the Park touring shows to Fort Lee in "Shakespeare Tuesdays". The group now performs regularly at Monument Park (1588 Palisade Avenue, next to the Fort Lee Museum) with two Tuesday shows per month during the summer. The festival also tours similar dates in Hackensack.

Since the mid-1980s, Fort Lee Koreatown has become a Korean dining destination.Lefkowitz, Melanie. "Bergen County's Fort Lee: Town With a View", The Wall Street Journal, April 30, 2011. Accessed October 12, 2021. Fort Lee's Korean food has been described by local food writers as being better than in Koreatown, Manhattan. Korean Chinese cuisine is now also available in Koreatown, as is misugaru. Korean cafés have become a major cultural element within Fort Lee's Koreatown, not only for the coffee, bingsu (shaved ice), and pastries, but also as communal gathering places.

Government
Local government
 Fort Lee is governed under the Borough form of New Jersey municipal government. The borough is one of 218 municipalities (of the 564) statewide that use this form of government. The governing body is comprised of the Mayor and the six-member Borough Council, with all positions elected at-large on a partisan basis as part of the November general election. A Mayor is elected directly by the voters to a four-year term of office. The Borough Council is comprised of six members elected to serve three-year terms on a staggered basis, with two seats coming up for election each year in a three-year cycle. The Borough form of government used by Fort Lee is a "weak mayor / strong council" government in which council members act as the legislative body with the mayor presiding at meetings and voting only in the event of a tie. The mayor can veto ordinances subject to an override by a two-thirds majority vote of the council. The mayor makes committee and liaison assignments for council members, and most appointments are made by the mayor with the advice and consent of the council."Forms of Municipal Government in New Jersey", p. 6. Rutgers University Center for Government Studies. Accessed June 3, 2015.

, the Mayor of Fort Lee is Democrat Mark Sokolich, whose term of office ends December 31, 2023. Members of the Borough Council are Council President Paul K. Yoon (D, 2023), Joseph L. Cervieri Jr. (D, 2024), Bryan Drumgoole (D, 2023; appointed to serve an unexpired term), Ila Kasofsky (D, 2025), Harvey Sohmer (D, 2024) and Peter J. Suh (D, 2025).2022 Municipal Data Sheet, Borough of Fort Lee. Accessed December 8, 2022.Bergen County November 8, 2022 General Election Statement of Vote, Bergen County, New Jersey Clerk, updated November 21, 2022. Accessed January 1, 2023.Precinct Summary Results Report - Combined 2020 Bergen County General Election - November 3, 2020 Official Results, Bergen County, New Jersey, December 3, 2020. Accessed January 1, 2021.

In November 2022, the borough council appointed Bryan Drumgoole to fill the seat expiring in December 2023 that had been held by Michael Sargenti until he resigned from office.

Federal, state and county representation
Fort Lee is located in the 5th Congressional District and is part of New Jersey's 37th state legislative district.2019 New Jersey Citizen's Guide to Government, New Jersey League of Women Voters. Accessed October 30, 2019. 

Prior to the 2011 reapportionment following the 2010 Census, Fort Lee had been in the 38th state legislative district. In redistricting following the 2010 census, which was in effect from 2013 to 2022, the borough was in the 9th congressional district.Salant, Jonathan D. "Big change, N.J.! 1.4M shifting to another congressional district. Use our tracker before voting.", NJ Advance Media for NJ.com, October 31, 2022. Accessed December 8, 2022. "But now more than 1.4 million residents are moving due to new district lines drawn by New Jersey's independent redistricting commission to reflect population shifts under the 2020 census.... Redistricting will shift 106 municipalities — nearly one in five — into new congressional districts.... Moving from the 9th Congressional District, currently represented by Democratic Rep. Bill Pascrell Jr., to the 5th Congressional District, represented by Democratic Rep. Josh Gottheimer."

 

Politics
As of March 2011, there were a total of 18,382 registered voters in Fort Lee, of which 7,537 (41.0% vs. 31.7% countywide) were registered as Democrats, 2,487 (13.5% vs. 21.1%) were registered as Republicans and 8,350 (45.4% vs. 47.1%) were registered as Unaffiliated. There were 8 voters registered to other parties. Among the borough's 2010 Census population, 52.0% (vs. 57.1% in Bergen County) were registered to vote, including 62.6% of those ages 18 and over (vs. 73.7% countywide).GCT-P7: Selected Age Groups: 2010 – State – County Subdivision; 2010 Census Summary File 1 for New Jersey , United States Census Bureau. Accessed December 7, 2013.

In the 2012 presidential election, Democrat Barack Obama received 7,891 votes (60.9% vs. 54.8% countywide), ahead of Republican Mitt Romney with 4,737 votes (36.6% vs. 43.5%) and other candidates with 104 votes (0.8% vs. 0.9%), among the 12,950 ballots cast by the borough's 19,738 registered voters, for a turnout of 65.6% (vs. 70.4% in Bergen County).Number of Registered Voters and Ballots Cast November 6, 2012 General Election Results – Bergen County , New Jersey Department of State Division of Elections, March 15, 2013. Accessed December 7, 2013. In the 2008 presidential election, Democrat Barack Obama received 8,624 votes (61.0% vs. 53.9% countywide), ahead of Republican John McCain with 5,236 votes (37.0% vs. 44.5%) and other candidates with 114 votes (0.8% vs. 0.8%), among the 14,144 ballots cast by the borough's 19,352 registered voters, for a turnout of 73.1% (vs. 76.8% in Bergen County).2008 General Election Results for Fort Lee", The Record. Accessed September 26, 2011. In the 2004 presidential election, Democrat John Kerry received 8,367 votes (61.1% vs. 51.7% countywide), ahead of Republican George W. Bush with 5,161 votes (37.7% vs. 47.2%) and other candidates with 100 votes (0.7% vs. 0.7%), among the 13,692 ballots cast by the borough's 18,294 registered voters, for a turnout of 74.8% (vs. 76.9% in the whole county).

In the 2013 gubernatorial election, Republican Chris Christie received 55.3% of the vote (3,735 cast), ahead of Democrat Barbara Buono with 43.5% (2,941 votes), and other candidates with 1.2% (78 votes), among the 6,992 ballots cast by the borough's 18,356 registered voters (238 ballots were spoiled), for a turnout of 38.1%. In the 2009 gubernatorial election, Democrat Jon Corzine received 5,187 ballots cast (58.8% vs. 48.0% countywide), ahead of Republican Chris Christie with 3,191 votes (36.2% vs. 45.8%), Independent Chris Daggett with 287 votes (3.3% vs. 4.7%) and other candidates with 38 votes (0.4% vs. 0.5%), among the 8,817 ballots cast by the borough's 18,854 registered voters, yielding a 46.8% turnout (vs. 50.0% in the county).

Emergency services and public safety

Police
The borough council created the Fort Lee Police Department in 1904, although it was not until 1927 that the council authorized the appointment of a full-time paid police chief. As of 2019, the police department had about 100 members.

Emergency medical services
The Fort Lee Volunteer Ambulance Corps, founded in 1971, provides emergency medical services to the Borough of Fort Lee, the George Washington Bridge, and the Palisades Interstate Parkway. One of the largest EMS agencies in the surrounding area, the Fort Lee Volunteer Ambulance Corps operates a fleet of four medium-duty ambulances, one first responder vehicle, and two command vehicles from its headquarters on the corner of Main Street and Anderson Avenue. In 2011, the agency purchased a new state-of-the-art ambulance, designated FLA-1, in order to begin retiring some of its aging ambulances. The agency plans to purchase a second ambulance sometime in 2013. With approximately 50 active members, the corps operates 24 hours a day on weekends and from 7 PM to 6 AM on weekdays, with paid borough employees staffing the ambulances during the day on weekdays. The Fort Lee Volunteer Ambulance Corps responds to approximately 3,400 emergency medical calls annually. The corps is a member agency of the East Bergen Ambulance Association (EBAA) with a standing mutual aid agreement with surrounding East Bergen boroughs.

Fire department
Fort Lee is protected around the clock by the volunteer firefighters of the Fort Lee Fire Department, which was founded in 1888 when the borough was still a part of Ridgefield Township and operates out of four fire stations. The Fort Lee Fire Department operates a fire apparatus fleet of six engines (including spares), two ladders, one heavy rescue, one squad (light rescue), two support services units, a mobile air cascade unit, four command vehicles(battalion and deputy chiefs), and six fire prevention units. The Fort Lee Fire Department's volunteer fire companies respond to, on average, approximately 1,800 emergency calls annually.

Education
Public schools
The Fort Lee School District serves public school students in pre-kindergarten through twelfth grade. As of the 2018–19 school year, the district, comprised of six schools, had an enrollment of 4,103 students and 301.2 classroom teachers (on an FTE basis), for a student–teacher ratio of 13.6:1. Schools in the district (with 2018–19 enrollment data from the National Center for Education Statistics) are 
School 1 (761 students in grades K–4), 
School 2 (493; Pre-K–4), 
School 3 (596; K–4), 
School 4 (614; K–4), 
Lewis F. Cole Intermediate School / Lewis F. Cole Middle School (585; 5–8) and 
Fort Lee High School (1,012; 9–12).

During the 2010–11 school year, School #3 was awarded the National Blue Ribbon School Award of Excellence by the United States Department of Education, the highest award an American school can receive, one of only ten schools statewide to be honored. The school was one of three in Bergen County honored that year.

Public school students from the borough, and all of Bergen County, are eligible to attend the secondary education programs offered by the Bergen County Technical Schools, which include the Bergen County Academies in Hackensack, and the Bergen Tech campus in Teterboro or Paramus. The district offers programs on a shared-time or full-time basis, with admission based on a selective application process and tuition covered by the student's home school district.Admissions , Bergen County Technical Schools. Accessed December 29, 2016.

Private schools
Private schools in the area include Christ the Teacher (Pre-K–8, 314 students), First Step Day Care Center (Pre-K, 101 students), Fort Lee Education Center (7–12, 78 students), Fort Lee Montessori Pre-School (Pre-K, 49 students), Fort Lee Youth Center Playgroup (Pre-K, 30 students), Futures Best Nursery Academy (Pre-K, 98 students), Green House Preschool and Kindergarten (Pre-K–K, 125 students), Happy Kids Pre-School (Pre-K, 75 students), Hooks Lane School (Pre-K, 54 students), Itsy Bitsy Early Learning Center (Pre-K, 60 students), Genesis Preschool & Academy (Pre-K, K–6, 83 students), Palisades Pre-School (Pre-K, 108 students), Rainbow School DC (Pre-K, 88 students), and Small World Montessori School (Pre-K, 51 students). Christ the Teacher Interparochial School operates under the supervision of the Roman Catholic Archdiocese of Newark.

Weekend supplementary education
The Japanese Weekend School of New Jersey (ニュージャージー補習授業校), a Japanese supplementary educational school, holds its classes at Paramus Catholic High School in Paramus while its offices are in Fort Lee. It is one of the two weekend Japanese school systems operated by the Japanese Educational Institute of New York (JEI; ニューヨーク日本人教育審議会 Nyūyōku Nihonjin Kyōiku Shingi Kai), a nonprofit organization which also operates two Japanese day schools in the New York City area.

In 1987 there were two juku (Japanese-style cram schools) in Fort Lee. One of the Fort Lee schools, Hinoki School, had 130 students. There were additionally two institutions trying to open juku in Fort Lee.

Transportation

Roads and highways

Fort Lee is served by the Palisades Interstate Parkway, Route 4, Route 5, Route 67, Interstate 95 (the northern terminus of the New Jersey Turnpike), U.S. Route 9W, U.S. Route 1/9, U.S. Route 46, and County Route 505. The George Washington Bridge (signed as I-95/US 1-9/US 46), the world's busiest motor vehicle bridge, crosses the Hudson River from Fort Lee to the Washington Heights neighborhood of Upper Manhattan in New York City. Many of these roads converge at GWB Plaza, a busy crossroads at the northern end of the borough.

Public transportation
Fort Lee is served by NJ Transit buses 154, 156, 158 and 159 to the Port Authority Bus Terminal in Midtown Manhattan; the 171, 175, 178, 181, 182, 186 and 188 lines to the George Washington Bridge Bus Terminal; and local service on the  751, 753, 755 and 756.Bergen County System Map , NJ Transit. Accessed September 14, 2016.

Rockland Coaches provides service along Route 9W on the 9T and 9AT bus lines and on the 14ET to the Port Authority Bus Terminal in Midtown Manhattan and on the 9 / 9A to the George Washington Bridge Bus Terminal.Schedule Details Fort Lee, NJ to New York, NY, Rockland Coaches. Accessed December 11, 2014. Saddle River Tours / Ameribus provides service to the George Washington Bridge Bus Station on route 11C.

The Fort Lee Parking Authority issues and controls parking passes, meter fees, and provides shuttles and non-emergency transportation. Marc Macri] a former law partner of Mayor Mark Sokolich, serves as Commissioner of the Fort Lee Parking Authority.

 two Taiwanese airlines, China Airlines and EVA Air, provide private bus services to and from John F. Kennedy International Airport in New York City for customers based in New Jersey. These bus services stop in Fort Lee.Free Shuttle Service Provided by China Airlines to/from New York JFK Airport.  China Airlines. September 15, 2015. Accessed January 3, 2017.

As of 2021, OurBus offers intercity bus service from the George Washington Bridge bus stop to various locations such as Rochester and Buffalo, New York.

Climate
The climate in this area is characterized by hot, humid summers and generally mild to cool winters.  According to the Köppen Climate Classification system, Fort Lee has a humid subtropical climate, abbreviated "Cfa" on climate maps.

Tallest buildings and structures

The George Washington Bridge (GWB), at  meters in height as measured from its base, is the tallest structure in Fort Lee. Since the 1960s, numerous residential high-rise buildings have been built along the Palisade Avenue-Boulevard East corridor. Fort Lee's population and housing density increased considerably during the 1960s and 1970s with the construction of highrise apartments.Hanley, Robert. "Fort Lee Changing Once Again", The New York Times, January 22, 1979. Accessed October 2, 2019.Goldberger, Paul. "The Palisades: Beauty and the Beast", The New York Times, January 25, 1976. Accessed October 2, 2019.

In media

 The borough was mentioned in "Weekend Update" segments involving fictional consumer affairs reporter Roseanne Roseannadanna, played by Gilda Radner, who almost always began reading letters by saying, "A Mr. Richard Feder from Fort Lee, New Jersey, writes in and says...." Feder was the brother-in-law of Saturday Night Live writer and segment co-creator Alan Zweibel and an actual Fort Lee resident until he moved to West Nyack, New York in 1981.Flegenheimer, Matt. "A Mr. Feder, Once of Fort Lee, Chimes In", The New York Times, January 11, 2014. Accessed September 7, 2014. "More than 30 years ago, Mr. Feder, 64, was perhaps Fort Lee's best-known resident, celebrated by a recurring character played by Gilda Radner on Saturday Night Live. The character, Roseanne Roseannadanna, would begin her segment on 'Weekend Update' by saying, 'A Mr. Richard Feder from Fort Lee, N.J., writes in and says ...'"
 In the 1984 film, The Adventures of Buckaroo Banzai Across the 8th Dimension, the character played by Jeff Goldblum (Dr. Sidney Zwibel/New Jersey) introduces himself as being from Fort Lee, earning him the nickname "New Jersey".
 In Desperately Seeking Susan, the main character Roberta (played by Rosanna Arquette) is from Fort Lee. A key thematic element of the film is the contrast between Roberta's life in New Jersey and her desire to experience Susan's lifestyle in New York City.
 Martin Scorsese directed several scenes of Goodfellas in Fort Lee.Filming Locations for Goodfellas, Internet Movie Database. Accessed May 14, 2007.
 Chabad of Fort Lee, a synagogue, was used as the filming location for the Queens, New York City residence of Detective Elliot Stabler on Law & Order: Special Victims Unit.
 In late March 2011, a group of teenagers reported that they had been detained by the Fort Lee Police Department who left them in a police van parked for 14 hours overnight at headquarters. The detainees, who said that they had no food, water or access to bathrooms during that time, were released after passers-by heard their screams. In December 2013, $120,000 was awarded to each of three of the teens as settlement of a lawsuit that alleged that they had been unlawfully detained and that police officers had used racial epithets.
 On March 2, 2012, The show Morning Joe on MSNBC aired live from Fort Lee High School. Joe Scarborough and Mika Brzezinski joined Gov. Chris Christie, Rev. Al Sharpton, Michelle Rhee, Harold Ford Jr., Howard Dean, Interim Superintendent of Fort Lee Schools (Steven Engravalle) and other invited guests to discuss New Jersey's education reform.

Notable people

People who were born in, residents of, or otherwise closely associated with Fort Lee include:

 Vito Albanese (1918–1998), politician who represented Bergen County in the New Jersey General Assembly from 1966 to 1968
 Albert Anastasia (1902–1957), Mafia bossHunt, Thomas. "King of the Brooklyn Docks: Albert Anastasia (1902-1957)" , The American Mafia. Accessed July 8, 2014. "In the mid-1940s, Anastasia decided to move away from Brooklyn and follow his longtime friend Joe Adonis to the country setting of Fort Lee, New Jersey. The Brooklyn home held in the name of his wife was sold for $25,000. The Anastasias built a new, 35-room, 5-bathroom house, valued at more than $75,000 at #75 Bluff Road in Fort Lee."
 Mickey Appleman (born 1946), professional poker player
 Allan Arkush (born 1948), film director and television producer known for Rock and Roll High School and the NBC series Heroes Miri Ben-Ari (born 1978), Israeli-American violinist
 Barbara Bennett (1906–1959), silent screen actress and literary representative
 Constance Bennett (1904–1965), stage and film actress
 Joan Bennett (1910–1990), stage and film actressvia Associated Press. "Joan Bennett dead at 80", The Daily News, December 6, 1990. Accessed June 30, 2012. "The actress, born in Fort Lee, N.J., made her 1928 debut in the Broadway play Jarnegan."
 Mike Berniker (1935–2008), record producer
 Alessandra Biaggi (born 1986), New York State Senator
 Balfour Brickner (1926–2005), rabbi emeritus of the Stephen Wise Free Synagogue in Manhattan
 Dr. Joyce Brothers (1927–2013), psychologist, television personalityFox, Margalit. "Dr. Joyce Brothers, On-Air Psychologist Who Made TV House Calls, Dies at 85", The New York Times, May 13, 2013. Accessed October 13, 2013. "Joyce Brothers, a former academic psychologist who, long before Drs. Ruth, Phil and Laura, was counseling millions over the airwaves, died on Monday at her home in Fort Lee, N.J. She was 85."
 Charlie Callas (1924–2011), comedian and actor
 Cam'ron (born 1976), rapper
 Jonathan Cheban (born 1974), reality-television star and entrepreneur, noted for his recurring role on the show Keeping Up with the Kardashians and its spinoffs
 Nai-Ni Chen (1959–2021), Taiwanese-American dancer and choreographer
 Jay Chiat (1931–2002), advertising agency executive
 Liz Claman (born 1963), Fox Business Network anchor
 Haskell Cohen (1914–2000), public relations director of National Basketball Association from 1950 to 1969, known as creator of  NBA All-Star Game
 Émile Cohl (1857–1938), French caricaturist, cartoonist, and animator
 Celia Cruz (1925–2003), Cuban-born salsa singer
 Morton Downey Jr. (1932–2001), singer, songwriter, radio and TV personality; host
 Bill Evans (1929–1980), jazz pianist and composerWilson, John S. "Bill Evans, Jazz Pianist Praised For Lyricism and Structure, Dies; 'In Touch With His Feelings' Trouble With Scales", The New York Times, September 17, 1980. Accessed June 30, 2009. "Mr. Evans, who lived in Fort Lee, N.J., toured in Europe this summer."
 Phil Foster (1913–1985), comedian and actor, played Frank De Fazio in Laverne & Shirley Buddy Hackett (1924–2003), comedian and actor
 Alan Hantman (born 1942), architect who served as the 10th Architect of the Capitol, from February 1997 until February 2007.
 Charles J. Hunt (1881–1976), film editor and director
 Jim Hunt, ice hockey former head coach and current president of the New Jersey Hitmen
 Arthur Imperatore Sr. (1925–2020), businessman best known as being the founder and president of the NY Waterway
 Jay-Z (born 1969), rapperRoss, Barbara; Singleton, Don; Santiago, Roberto; and Marzulli, John. "Jay-Z accused of knifing rival at party", New York Daily News, December 4, 1999. Accessed January 5, 2012. "all, Jay-Z, 29, who now lives in Fort Lee, N.J., was charged with two counts of first-degree assault and two counts of second-degree assault. Posner set a return date for Jan. 31."
 Ron Johnson (1947–2018), former NFL running back for the Cleveland Browns and New York Giants
 Ali Khatami (born 1953), former Iranian Presidential Chief of Staff
 Randy Klein (born 1949), musician, composer, pianist, author and educator 
 Samm Levine (born 1982), actor on Freaks and Geeks Nathaniel Lubell (1916–2006), Olympic fencer who competed for the United States in foil at the 1948 Summer Olympics in London, the 1952 Summer Olympics in Helsinki and the 1956 Summer Olympics in Melbourne
 Ted Manakas (born 1951), former professional basketball player who played briefly in the NBA for the Kansas City-Omaha Kings
 Eddie Mannix (1891–1963), film studio executive at Metro-Goldwyn-Mayer
 Willard Marshall (1921–2000), former MLB right fielder who played for the New York Giants, Boston Braves, Cincinnati Reds and Chicago White Sox
 D. Bennett Mazur (–1994), member of the New Jersey General Assembly
 Pierre McGuire (born 1961), ice hockey analyst and former NHL coach and scout
 Aline Brosh McKenna (born 1967), screenwriter who wrote the scripts for The Devil Wears Prada and 27 Dresses Bill O'Reilly (born 1949), television host, author, syndicated columnist and political commentator, host of The O'Reilly Factor on Fox News Channel
 John Orsino (1938–2016), Major League Baseball catcher who played for the San Francisco Giants (1961–1962), Baltimore Orioles (1963–1965) and Washington Senators (1966–1967)
 Johnny Pacheco (1935–2021), Dominican musician, arranger, bandleader and record producer, who was the founder and musical director of Fania Records
 Christopher Porrino (born 1967), lawyer who became served as New Jersey Attorney General from 2016 to 2018
 George Price (1901–1995), cartoonist best known for his work for The New Yorker Nia Reed (born 1996), professional volleyball player and member of United States women's national volleyball team
 Richard Reines, recording industry executive, co-owner of Drive-Thru Records
 Freddie Roman (1937–2022), comedian, New York Friars' Club notable
 Joe Rosario (born 1959), actor, writer, director
 Murray Sabrin (born 1946), college professor and Libertarian Party / Republican Party politician
 Amy Scheer, professional sports executive who is general manager of the Connecticut Whale of the Premier Hockey Federation
 August Semmendinger (1820–1885), photographic inventor
 Eva Shain (–1999), boxing judge, one of the first female judges in New York, first woman to judge a heavyweight championship bout (1977 fight between Muhammad Ali and Earnie Shavers)
 Jenn Sherman (born 1969), fitness instructor who was the very first cycling instructor hired at Peloton Interactive
 Anton Sikharulidze (born 1976), Olympic gold medal-winning pairs figure skater
 Phoebe Snow (1950–2011), singer
 Alfonso Soriano (born 1976), outfielder who plays for the New York Yankees
 Darryl Strawberry (born 1962), Major League Baseball outfielder who played for New York Mets, New York Yankees and Los Angeles Dodgers
 Anthony Strollo (1899–1962), New York mobster who served as a high-ranking capo of the Genovese crime family until his disappearance after leaving his home in Fort Lee
 Lyle Stuart (1922–2006), independent publisher of controversial books
 Justin Tuck (born 1983), former NFL defensive end who played for the New York Giants and Oakland Raiders
 June Valli (1928–1993), singer and television personality.
 James Van Fleet (1892–1992), United States Army general
 Chien-Ming Wang (born 1980), pitcher for the Washington Nationals
 Jennifer Wu (born 1990), table tennis player originally from China who has been named to the U.S. team at the 2016 Summer Olympics
 Glen Zipper (born 1974), writer, film producer and former New Jersey assistant state prosecutor known for the Academy Award-winning film UndefeatedSee also
 Fort Lee lane closure controversy
 List of tallest buildings in Fort Lee
 Riviera (nightclub)
 List of U.S. cities with significant Korean-American populations

References
Notes

Bibliography
 Municipal Incorporations of the State of New Jersey (according to Counties)'' prepared by the Division of Local Government, Department of the Treasury (New Jersey); December 1, 1958.
 Clayton, W. Woodford; and Nelson, William. History of Bergen and Passaic Counties, New Jersey, with Biographical Sketches of Many of its Pioneers and Prominent Men. Philadelphia: Everts and Peck, 1882.
 Harvey, Cornelius Burnham (ed.), Genealogical History of Hudson and Bergen Counties, New Jersey. New York: New Jersey Genealogical Publishing Co., 1900.
 Van Valen, James M. History of Bergen County, New Jersey. New York: New Jersey Publishing and Engraving Co., 1900.
 Westervelt, Frances A. (Frances Augusta), 1858–1942, History of Bergen County, New Jersey, 1630–1923, Lewis Historical Publishing Company, 1923.

External links

 Borough of Fort Lee web site
 Fort Lee Police Department
 Fort Lee Volunteer Fire Department
 Fort Lee Volunteer Ambulance Corps
 Fort Lee School District
 
 School Data for the Fort Lee School District, National Center for Education Statistics
 An enlarged view of road jurisdiction at the Fort Lee approaches to the George Washington Bridge

 
1904 establishments in New Jersey
Borough form of New Jersey government
Boroughs in Bergen County, New Jersey
Lee
Populated places established in 1904
New Jersey populated places on the Hudson River
Film production districts
History of film
Cinema pioneers
Silent film